The World Figure Skating Championships is an annual figure skating competition sanctioned by the International Skating Union in which figure skaters compete for the title of World Champion.

The competition took place from February 10 to 11 in Stockholm, Sweden. Originally allotted to London the competition was transferred to Stockholm due to the death of Queen Victoria. There were only two contestants. Four out of six judges came from Sweden. None of the judges came from the German Empire. Still the placings were the same. Adams, Pettersson, and Westergren put Salchow in first position, the other three judges Fuchs.

Results

Men

Judges:
 W. F. Adams 
 G. Euler 
 A. Hansson 
 L. Lindquist 
 H. Pettersson 
 Ivar Westergren

References

World Figure Skating Championships
World Figure Skating Championships, 1901
Figure skating in Sweden
International figure skating competitions hosted by Sweden
February 1901 sports events
1901 in Swedish sport
1900s in Stockholm
International sports competitions in Stockholm